Shamator–Chessore Assembly constituency is one of the 60 Legislative Assembly constituencies of Nagaland state in India. It is part of Shamator District and is reserved for candidates belonging to the Scheduled Tribes.

Members of the Legislative Assembly

Election results

2021 by-election 
In the October 2021 by-election, Keoshu Yimchunger of the NDPP was unchallenged, and hence won the seat by default. The by-election was needed because of the death of the sitting member, Toshi Wungtung, on 1 July 2021.

2018

See also
 List of constituencies of the Nagaland Legislative Assembly
 Tuensang district

References

Tuensang district
Assembly constituencies of Nagaland